Eduardo Oliveira dos Santos (born 28 September 1972), known as Eduardo Oliveira, is a Brazilian former professional footballer who played as a defender. As of 2021, he simultaneously works as an assistant coach for Thouars and as the head coach of the club's reserve team.

Honours 
Île-Rousse

 Division 4: 1992–93

Sedan

 Coupe de France runner-up: 1998–99

Saint-Étienne

 Ligue 2: 2003–04

Notes

References 

1972 births
Living people
Footballers from São Paulo
Brazilian footballers
French footballers
Association football defenders
French people of Brazilian descent
Naturalized citizens of France
Brazilian emigrants to France
Sport Club Corinthians Paulista players
FC Balagne players
FC Martigues players
FC Istres players
CS Sedan Ardennes players
AS Saint-Étienne players
U.D. Leiria players
Stade Brestois 29 players
Olympique Saumur FC players
Thouars Foot 79 players
French Division 4 (1978–1993) players
Championnat National 2 players
Championnat National players
Ligue 2 players
Ligue 1 players
Championnat National 3 players
Division d'Honneur players
Brazilian football managers
French football managers
Association football coaches
Association football player-managers
Thouars Foot 79 non-playing staff

Brazilian expatriate footballers
French expatriate footballers
Expatriate footballers in Portugal
Brazilian expatriate sportspeople in Portugal
French expatriate sportspeople in Portugal